Itimi Wilson is a Nigerian former footballer.

Singapore

Plying his trade with the Prime League and senior teams of Singapore S.League club Balestier Khalsa, Wilson once tallied six goals in a Prime League game facing Jurong. However, along with Wisdom Onyekwere, the Nigerian striker was axed from their roster in 2003.

In 2001, Wilson was found to be living in a  3 x 5m storeroom with four other players, besmirching the reputation of Balestier Khalsa and the S.League.

Personal life

He is the brother of Itimi Dickson.

References

External links
 Sacked Nigerian duo want compensation

Association football forwards
Expatriate footballers in Singapore
Living people
Singapore Premier League players
Balestier Khalsa FC players
Nigerian footballers
Nigerian expatriate footballers
Year of birth missing (living people)